Beaune-d'Allier is a commune in the Allier department in central France.

Population

Administration 
 2008–2014: Jean Clement
 2014–2020: Jean-Jacques Mercier
 2020–current: Jacques Philip

See also
Communes of the Allier department

References

Communes of Allier
Allier communes articles needing translation from French Wikipedia